Countess Dora is a Croatian pseudo-biographical film about Croatian composer Dora Pejačević. Filmed in 1990, it was released in public in 1993. It was written and directed by Zvonimir Berković. It was Croatia's submission to the 66th Academy Awards for the Academy Award for Best Foreign Language Film, but was not accepted as a nominee.

Plot
Karlo Armano, a cabaret entertainer and film aficionado, meets countess Dora Pejačević in Zagreb. The two become close, and after a while Armano visits her at her estate in Slavonia hoping to spur the countess' romantic interest in him, but also to find a well-to-do patron for his film endeavors...

Cast

Alma Prica as Countess Dora Pejačević
Rade Šerbedžija as Karlo Armano
Irina Alfyorova as Sidonija Nadherny
Relja Bašić as Izidor Kršnjavi
Božidar Boban as Hugo pl. Mihalović
Helena Buljan as Didi
Eliza Gerner as Landlady
Ivo Gregurević as Maksimilijan Vanka
Zdravka Krstulović as Lilla
Tonko Lonza as Count Teodor Pejačević
Jadranka Matković as Hysterical Woman
Mustafa Nadarević as Tuna the Driver
Dubravka Ostojić
Ksenija Pajić as Stefi Geyer

See also
Cinema of Croatia
List of submissions to the 66th Academy Awards for Best Foreign Language Film
List of Croatian submissions for the Academy Award for Best Foreign Language Film

References

Further reading

External links

Countess Dora at hrfilm.hr 

1993 films
1993 drama films
Films shot in Croatia
1990s Croatian-language films
Films directed by Zvonimir Berković
Films about classical music and musicians
Croatian biographical films